Shania is a feminine given name, popularized by the country and pop singer Shania Twain. It is pronounced with the stress on the i, as in Mariah. Twain, born Eilleen Regina Edwards, adopted the surname of her stepfather, Gerald "Jerry" Twain, an Ojibwe, and later changed her given name to "Shania" in his honour.

Several sources contend that the name is of Ojibwe origin meaning "I'm on my way", or "she is on her way". However, Twain's biographer, Robin Eggar, writes: "There is a continuing confusion about what 'Shania' means and if indeed it is an Ojibwe word or phrase at all. [...] There is no mispronounced or misheard phrase in either Ojibwe or Cree that comes close to meaning 'on my way.' Yet the legend of her name continues to be repeated in the media to this day."

Robin Eggar was incorrect about there being no Ojibwe phrase with a similar meaning which sounds like Shania. "Ani aya'aa", pronounced "Ah-nih Eye-uh-ah", means "someone on the way" in Ojibwe. It is therefore possible that someone with an imperfect knowledge of the Ojibwe language created Shania with the incorrect idea it would mean "she's on the way".

According to the English onomastician Patrick Hanks, the name is a recent elaboration of the given name Shana.

Persons with this given name include:
 Shania Collins (born 1996), African-American athlete
 , Indonesian singer and a member of the Indonesian idol group JKT48
 Shania Hayles (born 1999), Jamaican footballer
 , Indonesian singer and former member of JKT48
 Shania Robba (born 2001), Gibraltarian footballer
 Shania Twain (born 1965), Canadian singer-songwriter
 Shania Vogt (born 1999), Liechtenstein footballer

See also 
 Sania
 Sanja
 Sanya (name)

References 

English feminine given names
Feminine given names